Allen Scotting (born 22 April 1966) is an English former professional footballer who played as a left back and midfielder.

Career
Born in Dartford, Scotting played youth football with Arsenal and Charlton Athletic. He signed for Gillingham in April 1983 and turned professional in February 1984.  He made his senior debut later that month, in the Associate Members' Cup. He made his league debut in April 1984. He made a total of two Football League appearances for Gillingham in 1984, and three appearances for the club in all competitions. He later played non-league football for Bromley (three spells), Maidstone United, Fisher Athletic, Margate, Erith & Belvedere (two spells) and Phoenix Sports.

References

1966 births
Living people
Sportspeople from Dartford
English footballers
Arsenal F.C. players
Charlton Athletic F.C. players
Gillingham F.C. players
Bromley F.C. players
Maidstone United F.C. (1897) players
Fisher Athletic F.C. players
Margate F.C. players
Erith & Belvedere F.C. players
English Football League players
Association football fullbacks
Association football midfielders